The Bohai Economic Rim (BER) or Bohai Bay Economic Rim (BBER) is the economic region surrounding Tianjin (Tientsin). It also includes areas in Hebei, Liaoning and Shandong surrounding the Bohai Sea. This region has undergone major economic and infrastructural changes and is an emerging economic powerhouse of North China, rivaling both the Pearl River Delta in southern China and the Yangtze River Delta in eastern China.

Economy
The Bohai Economic Rim has traditionally been involved in heavy industry and manufacturing. Tianjin's strengths have always been in aviation, logistics and shipping. Beijing complements this with strong petrochemical, education and R&D sectors. The area is becoming a significant growth cluster for the automobile, electronics, and petrochemical sectors, especially with Shenyang's automotive industry, software and aircraft, Dalian attracting foreign investments in manufacturing and Qingdao for its health services.

The Chinese central government has made it a priority to integrate all the cities in the Bohai Bay rim and foster economic development. This includes building an advanced communications network, better highways, increased education and scientific resources as well as tapping natural resources off the Bohai rim.

In recent decades, petroleum and natural gas deposits have been discovered in Bohai Sea.

Transport

Air
Major airports:

Beijing Capital International Airport
Beijing Daxing International Airport
Dalian Zhoushuizi International Airport
Jinan Yaoqiang International Airport
Qingdao Liuting International Airport
Shenyang Taoxian International Airport
Tianjin Binhai International Airport
Shijiazhuang Zhengding International Airport
Regional airports:
Beijing Nanyuan Airport
Chengde Airport
Qinhuangdao Beidaihe Airport
Tangshan Sannühe Airport
Weihai Airport
Yantai Laishan International Airport
Zhangjiakou Ningyuan Airport

Land
There are many major highways servicing the routes within the Bohai rim area.

Rail
Since 2000, there have been rapid infrastructure developments within the Bohai Economic Rim. Rail projects of varied natures have been built, including high-speed rail, metros and suburban rail.

High-speed rail 
In 2006, the Chinese government had plans to construct  of high-speed railway in the Beijing-Tianjin-Hebei region by 2020.

In August 2008, the Beijing–Tianjin Intercity Railway opened providing a direct route between Beijing and Tianjin. The initial trains run on average 300 km/h and have cut journey times between the two municipalities to half an hour. The most important High-Speed Railway here is Beijing-Shanghai High-Speed Railway, which connected the Bohai Economic Rim to the Yangtze River Delta. This railway passing Jinan, Shandong's capital city. Another important High-speed railway in this area is Beijing-Guangzhou High-Speed Railway, passing Shijiazhuang, the capital of Hebei. Besides, there is Beijing-Harbin High-Speed Railway, passing Liaoning's capital Shenyang.

Light rail 
 Tianjin Tram
 Dalian Tram

Metros 
 Beijing Subway
 Tianjin Metro
 Shenyang Metro
 Shijiazhuang Metro

Suburban railway 
 Beijing Suburban Railway
 Tianjin Suburban Railway (Tianjin–Jizhou railway)

Geography
The gulf is formed by the Liaodong Peninsula to the northeast and the Shandong Peninsula to the south. Bo Hai consists of three bays: Laizhou Bay to the south, Liaodong Bay to the north, and Bohai Wan to the west. The rivers Yellow River, Liao He, Hai He and Luan River empty into Bo Hai.

The Bohai economic rim includes Beijing, Tianjin, part of Hebei province, part of Liaoning province, and part of Shandong province. List of major cities or ports in these municipalities and provinces are listed below:

Inner Rim (Jingjinji)
 Municipalities: Beijing and Tianjin (Binhai New Area)
 Hebei Province: Tangshan, Qinhuangdao, Cangzhou, Langfang, Chengde, Zhangjiakou, Shijiazhuang and Baoding

North Rim (Liaoning)
 Shenyang, Dalian, Dandong, Huludao, Jinzhou, Yingkou, Anshan, and Panjin

South Rim (Shandong)
 Jinan, Qingdao, Weihai, Weifang, Yantai, Dongying, Binzhou, and Zibo

Pollution
A Xinhua News Agency report in February, 2007, states: “Effluent has turned the sea a dark red and given it an acrid stench at Guanxi’s Silver Beach, a national tourist attraction. Local staff say it is not the first time this has happened – sometimes it occurs every few days. They blame the run-off from nearby shellfish processing plants.”

Jiaozhou Bay-Laizhou Bay Canal
In April 2004, an official of the Shandong province raised the possibility of constructing a canal between Jiaozhou Bay and Laizhou Bay as a means of easing the pollution problem in the Bohai Sea. The proposed canal will also be open to ships traveling between Bohai Sea and the Yellow Sea. A meeting held in Qingdao in October, 2006, was attended by more than a hundred members of academia.

See also
 Bohai Sea
 Jing-Jin-Ji
 Megalopolises in China
 Pearl River Delta
 Yangtze River Delta

References

External links
Bohai Economic Rim 环渤海湾经济圈
Bohai Rim's future 环渤海——中国经济的未来
Rising investment in Bohai Rim 环渤海经济圈正在吸引越来越多房产商的目光
Cooperation between Bohai Rim and Northeast region
Info on Bohai surrounding region
Role of Tangshan in Bohai Rim

Bays of China
Metropolitan areas of China
Gulfs of the Pacific Ocean
Proposed infrastructure in China